Michael Carter (born April 28, 1986) is a former professional Canadian football defensive back. He played in seven seasons in the Canadian Football League (CFL).

College career
Carter played college football for the Maryland Terrapins.

Professional career
Carter was drafted 19th overall by the BC Lions in the 2011 CFL Draft, but was released after training camp. He subsequently signed with the Hamilton Tiger-Cats on June 27, 2011. Carter was released near the end of the 2011 CFL season on October 26, 2011. It was announced that Carter had signed with the Montreal Alouettes on January 27, 2011. After a three-year stint with the Alouettes, he signed with the Saskatchewan Roughriders on February 25, 2015. He played for half a season for the Roughriders prior to being released on August 15, 2015. On September 15, 2015, Carter signed with the Edmonton Eskimos as a free agent and was added to their practice roster. He was later released by the Eskimos on November 30, 2015.  On August 17, 2016, Carter was signed by the Toronto Argonauts. After one season with the Argonauts, he signed with the Montreal Alouettes. He was released by the Alouettes on May 2, 2018.

References

External links
 Toronto Argonauts profile

1986 births
Living people
BC Lions players
Canadian football defensive backs
Edmonton Elks players
Hamilton Tiger-Cats players
Maryland Terrapins football players
Montreal Alouettes players
Players of Canadian football from Ontario
Saskatchewan Roughriders players
Sportspeople from Windsor, Ontario
Toronto Argonauts players